Terap Adoum Yaya (born October 10, 1974) is a middle distance athlete who competed internationally for Chad

Yaya represented Chad at the 1992 Summer Olympics in Barcelona, he competed in the 800 metres where he finished 6th in his heat and therefore did not qualify for the next round, four years later he competed at the 1996 Summer Olympics in Atlanta again he entered the 800 metres this time he finished 7th in his heat.

References

1974 births
Living people
Olympic athletes of Chad
Athletes (track and field) at the 1992 Summer Olympics
Athletes (track and field) at the 1996 Summer Olympics
Chadian male middle-distance runners